This is a list of reference works involves encyclopedias and encyclopedic dictionaries of any language published on the subject of film/cinema, radio, television, and mass communications, including related biographical dictionaries of actors, directors, etc.

Entries are in the English language except where noted.

Animation
Clements, Jonathan; McCarthy, Helen (2001). The Anime Encyclopedia: A Guide to Japanese Animation Since 1917. US: Stone Bridge Press.
McCarthy, Helen (1996). The Anime Movie Guide: Japanese Animation since 1983. London: Titan. 

Kapkov, Sergey (2007). Encyclopedia of Domestic Animation (in Russian). Russia: Algorithm-kniga.
Lenburg, Jeff (1991). The Encyclopedia of Animated Cartoons. Facts on File.
Stuckmann, Chris (2018). Anime Impact: The Movies and Shows that Changed the World of Japanese Animation. Mango Media. .
Anime News Network [online database]
 The Big Cartoon DataBase [online database]

Film

Bawden, Liz-Anne, ed. (1976). The Oxford Companion to Film. New York: Oxford University Press. .

Branigan, Edward; Buckland, Warren (eds.) (2015). The Routledge Encyclopedia of Film Theory. Routledge. .
Brown, Gene, ed. (1984). The New York Times Encyclopedia of Film. Times Books.

Microsoft Corporation (1992–97). Microsoft Cinemania [digital database].
Craggs, Stewart R. (1998). Soundtracks: An international dictionary of composers for film. Ashgate. .
Fernett, Gene (1988). American Film Studios: An Historical Encyclopedia. McFarland.
Halliwell, Leslie (1977). Halliwell's Film Guide. HarperCollins.
—— (1993). Halliwell's Filmgoer's Companion (10th ed.). HarperCollins.
Herbert, Stephen; McKernan, Luke (1996). Who's Who of Victorian Cinema. British Film Institute.
 
Maltin, Leonard (1969–2014). Leonard Maltin's Movie Guide. New American Library.

Magill, Frank N. Magill's American Film Guide. Salem Press.
—— (1980–85). Magill's Survey of Cinema. Salem Press.

Monaco, James (1991). The Encyclopedia of Film. Perigee Books. .
Nash, Jay Robert; Ross, Stanley R. (1985–87). The Motion Picture Guide. CineBooks.
The New York Times (1913–74). The New York Times Film Reviews. New York: New York Times and Arno Press. .

Thomas, Nicholas; Vinson, James (1990–93). The International Dictionary of Films and Filmmakers (2nd ed.)/ St. James Press.
Thomson, David (1975). A Biographical Dictionary of Cinema. Secker & Warburg.
—— (2014). The New Biographical Dictionary of Film. Alfred A. Knopf. .
 

AllMovie [online database].

Specific to genre/film subject

Hardy, Phil (1983–98). The Aurum Film Encyclopedia, 4 vols. UK: Aurum Press.
1983. Volume 1: The Western (Google Books)
1984. Volume 2: Science Fiction (Google Books)
1984. Volume 3: Horror
1998. Volume 4: The Gangster Film.

Picart, Caroline Joan (2004). The Holocaust Film Sourcebook. Praeger. .

Action / war

Lentz, Robert J. (2003). Korean War Filmography: 91 English Language Features Through 2000. McFarland. .

Picart, Caroline Joan (2004). The Holocaust Film Sourcebook. Praeger. .

Musicals
Green, Stanley (1981). Encyclopedia of the Musical Film. Oxford University Press. 
Hirschhorn, Clive. (1981). Hollywood Musical. Crown.

Specific to culture 

Slide, Anthony (1986). International Film Industry: A Historical Dictionary. Greenwood.

American / Hollywood

Allon, Yoram; Cullen, Del; Patterson, Hannah (2002). Contemporary North American film directors: A Wallflower critical guide. Wallflower. .

Siegel, Scott; Siegel, Barbara (1990). Encyclopedia of Hollywood. Facts on File.
Slide, Anthony (1986). The American Film Industry: A Historical Dictionary. Greenwood.

Asian

McCarthy, Helen (1996). The Anime Movie Guide: Japanese Animation since 1983. London: Titan. 

Stuckmann, Chris (2018). Anime Impact: The Movies and Shows that Changed the World of Japanese Animation. Mango Media. .

Volume 1: The Horror, Fantasy, and Sci Fi Films
Volume 2: The Sex Films

European

Allon, Yoram; Cullen, Del; Patterson, Hannah (2001). Contemporary British and Irish film directors: A Wallflower Critical Guide. Wallflower. .
Burton, Alan; Chibnall, Steve (2013). Historical Dictionary of British Cinema. Scarecrow. .
 
Kapkov, Sergey (2007). Encyclopedia of Domestic Animation (in Russian). Russia: Algorithm-kniga. 
 

Latin & Hispanic

Keller, Gary D.; Keller, Estela (1997). A Biographical Handbook of Hispanics and United States Film. Bilingual Press/Editorial Bilingüe. .
Osuna, Alfonso J. García (2003). The Cuban Filmography, 1897 Through 2001. McFarland. .

Online film databases 

 AFI Catalog of Feature Films
 AllMovie
 Complete Index to World Film
 Filmweb (in Polish)
 IMDb (crowd-sourced)

Specialized

 Art of the Title — title sequences
 Box Office Mojo — box-office revenue
 The Big Cartoon DataBase — animation
 FindAnyFilm — film availability
 Internet Movie Cars Database — motor vehicles in film
 Internet Movie Firearms Database — firearms in film
 Little Golden Guy — Academy Awards stats
 Lumiere — film admissions in Europe
 Metacritic — aggregated reviews
 Moviemistakes.com — production mistakes
 The Numbers — box-office revenue
 Movie Review Query Engine — review index
 Rotten Tomatoes — aggregated reviews

Culture-specific

 AlloCiné — French cinema
 Animator.ru — Russian and Soviet cinema
 Anime News Network — Japanese animation
 BFI Film & TV Database — British cinema
 Box Office India — Indian cinema
 Christian Film Database — Christian cinema
 Ciné-Ressources — French film archives
 Cinenacional.com — Argentine cinema
 Czech Movie Heaven — Czech and Slovak cinema
 Danish Film Database — Danish cinema
 Elonet — Finnish cinema
 Filmarchives online — European film archives
 Filmfront — Norwegian cinema
 Filmportal.de — German cinema
 Filmweb — Polish cinema (and world cinema)
 HanCinema — Korean cinema
 Hong Kong Cinemagic — Chinese-language cinema from China, Hong Kong, and Taiwan
 Hong Kong Movie DataBase — Hong Kong cinema
 Japanese Movie Database — Japanese cinema
 KinoPoisk — Russian cinema
 Koimoi — Hindi-language cinema
 Korean Movie Database — Korean cinema
 Nollywood Reinvented — Nigerian cinema
 PORT.hu — Central European cinema
 Stopklatka.pl — Polish cinema
 Svensk mediedatabas — search engine for audiovisual works by the National Library of Sweden 
 Swedish Film Database — Swedish cinema

Adult films

 Adult Film Database
 Internet Adult Film Database

Media, entertainment, communications 
Abercrombie, Nicholas, and Brian Longhurst. 2007. The Penguin Dictionary of Media Studies. Penguin Books. .
Barnouw, Eric. 1989. International Encyclopedia of Communications. Oxford University Press.
Damesi, Marcel. 2000. Encyclopedic Dictionary of Semiotics, Media, and Communications. Toronto: University of Toronto Press. .
Hartley, John. 2002. Communication, cultural and media studies: the key concepts. Routledge. .
Schement, Jorge Reina. 2002. Encyclopedia of Communication and Information. Macmillan Reference USA. .
Marquis Who's Who. 1985–. Who's Who in Media & Communications.
——  1989–99. Who’s Who in Entertainment.
Monaco, James. 1971. The Dictionary of New Media: The New Digital World of Video, Audio, and Print. Preview.
Studio System by Gracenote [online entertainment database]
 Variety Insight [online entertainment database]

Media companies and franchises 
Shields, Brian, and Kevin Sullivan. 2008. WWE Encyclopedia: The Definitive Guide to World Wrestling Entertainment. Dorling Kindersley.
Smith, Dave. 1996. Disney A to Z: The Official Encyclopedia (1st ed.). New York: Hyperion. .
Velasco, Raymond L. 1984. A Guide to the Star Wars Universe (1st ed.). Del Rey.
List of Star Trek reference books
Trimble, Bjo. 1976. Star Trek Concordance (2nd ed.). Ballantine Books.

Mass media
Downing, John. 2011. Encyclopedia of Social Movement Media. SAGE Publishing. .
Hixson, Richard. 1989. Mass Media and the Constitution: An Encyclopedia of Supreme Court Cases. Garland.
Hudson, Robert V. 1987. Mass Media: A Chronological Encyclopedia of Television, Radio, Motion Pictures, Magazines, Newspapers, and Books in the United States. Garland.

Radio
 Brooks, Tim, and Earle Marsh. 1979. The Complete Directory to Prime Time Network and Cable TV Shows 1946–Present. US: Ballantine Books.
 Dunning, John. 1976. Tune In Yesterday: The Ultimate Encyclopedia of Old Radio, 1925-76. Prentice-Hall.
—— 1998. On the Air: The Encyclopedia of Old-Time Radio (1st ed.). New York: Oxford University Press. .
Terrace, Vincent. 1981. Radio's Golden Years: The Encyclopedia of Radio Programs, 1930–60. San Diego: A. S. Barnes. .
Swartz, Jon, and Robert Reinert. 1993. Handbook of Old-Time Radio: A Comprehensive Guide to Golden Age Radio Listening and Collecting. Scarecrow Press.

Theatre and performing arts 
Banham, Martin. 1989. The Cambridge Guide to World Theatre. Cambridge University Press.
Benson, Eugene, and L. W. Conolly. 1989. The Oxford Companion to Canadian Theatre. Oxford University Press.
Dumur, Guy. 1965. Encyclopédie de la Pléiade 19: Histoire des spectacles (in French). Éditions Gallimard. Google Books.
Esslin, Martin. 1977. Encyclopedia of World Theater. Scribner's.
Gänzl, Kurt, and Andrew Lamb. 1989. Gänzl's Book of the Musical Theatre. Schirmer.
Gelli, Piero 1978. Encyclopedia of Performing Arts (in Italian). Garzanti.
Green, Stanley. 1976. Encyclopedia of the Musical Theatre. Dodd, Mead.
Hartnoll, Phyllis. 1983. Oxford Companion to the Theatre. Oxford University Press.
Hartnoll, Phyllis, and Peter Found. 1992. Concise Oxford Companion to the Theatre. Oxford Univ. Press.

Lounsbury, Warren C., and Norman Boulanger. 1989. Theatre Backstage from A to Z. University of Washington Press.
—— 1992. Theatre Lighting from A to Z. University of Washington Press.

Packard, William. 1988. Facts on File Dictionary of the Theatre. Facts on File. 
Thurston, James. 1992. The What, Where, When of Theater Props: An Illustrated Chronology from Arrowheads to Video Games. Betterway Books.
Vince, Ronald W. 1989. A Companion to the Medieval Theatre. Greenwood.
Zylbercweig, Zalmen, ed. 1931–69. Lexicon of Yiddish Theatre.

Enciclopédia Itaú Cultural de Teatro  [online database]. Brazil: Ministerio da Cultura, Government of Brazil. 2001–present.

American theatre
Boardman, Gerald. 1984. The Oxford Companion to American Theatre. Oxford University Press.
—— 1987. Concise Oxford Companion to American Theatre. Oxford University Press. 
Bronner, Edwin. 1979. Encyclopedia of the American Theatre, 1900–1975. A. S. Barnes. 
Navarro, Jerónimo Herrera. 1993. Catálogo de autores teatrales del siglo XVIII (in Spanish). Spain: Fundación Universitaria Española. . 
Sampson, Henry T. 1988. The Ghost Walks: A Chronological History of Blacks in Show Business, 1865–1910. Scarecrow Press. 
Wilmeth, Don B., and Tice L. Miller. 1993. The Cambridge Guide to American Theatre. Cambridge University Press. 
Woll, Allen. 1983. Dictionary of the Black Theatre: Broadway, Off-Broadway, and Selected Harlem Theatre. Greenwood.

American musical theatre
Bloom, Ken. American Song: The Complete Musical Theatre Companion. Facts on File, 1985.
Boardman, Gerald. 1981. American Operetta. Oxford University Press.
—— 1982. American Musical Comedy. Oxford UP.
—— 1985. American Musical Revue. Oxford UP.
—— 1992. The American Musical Theatre: A Chronicle. Oxford UP.

Hischak, Thomas S. 1993. Stage It with Music: An Encyclopedic Guide to the American Musical Theatre. Greenwood.
—— 2008. The Oxford Companion to the American Musical: Theatre, Film, and Television. Oxford University Press. .
Lewine, Richard, and Alfred Simon. 1984. Songs of the Theater. H. W. Wilson.

New York / Broadway
Bloom, Ken. 1991. Broadway: An Encyclopedic Guide to the History, People, and Places of Times Square. Facts on File.
Hischak, Thomas S. 2006. Enter the playmakers: Directors and choreographers on the New York stage. Scarecrow Press. .
Leiter, Samuel L. 1985. The Encyclopedia of the New York Stage, 1920–1930. Greenwood.
—— 1989. The Encyclopedia of the New York Stage, 1930–1940. Greenwood.
—— 1992. The Encyclopedia of the New York Stage, 1940–1950. Greenwood.

Asian theatre 

Brandon, James R. 1993. Cambridge Guide to Asian Theatre. Cambridge University Press.
Leiter, Samuel L. 1979. Art of Kabuki: Famous Plays in Performance. University of California Press.
—— 1979. Kabuki Encyclopedia: An English-Language Adaptation of Kabuki Jiten. Greenwood.

Ballet
Balanchine, George, and Francis Mason. 1989. 101 Stories of the Great Ballets. Doubleday.
Bremser, Martha. 1993. International Dictionary of Ballet. St. James Press. 
Clarke, Mary, and Clement Crisp. 1981. Ballet Goer's Guide. Knopf.
Koegler, Horst. 1982. The Concise Oxford Dictionary of Ballet. Oxford University Press.

European theatre 
Cooper, Barbara T. 1998. French Dramatists, 1789–1914. Gale Research. .
Demastes, William W. 1996. British Playwrights, 1956–1995: A Research and Production Sourcebook. Greenwood Press. .
Kosch, Wilhelm, and Ingrid Bigler-Marschall. 1953–2012. Deutsches Theater-Lexikon. Germany: De Gruyter. .
Navarro, Jerónimo Herrera. 1993. Catálogo de autores teatrales del siglo XVIII. Fundación Universitaria Española. .
O'Neil, Mary Anne. 2006. Twentieth-century French Dramatists. Thomson Gale. .
Parker, Mary. 1998. Spanish dramatists of the Golden Age: A bio-bibliographical sourcebook. Greenwood Press. .
—— 2002. Modern Spanish dramatists: A bio-bibliographical sourcebook. Greenwood Press. .
Richel, Veronica C. 1988. The German Stage, 1767-1890: A directory of playwrights and plays. Greenwood Press. .
Theaterlexikon der Schweiz (online database). Institute for Theater Studies, University of Bern
Print edition:  (French edition: Dictionnaire du théâtre en Suisse; Italian: Dizionario Teatrale Svizzero; Romansh: Lexicon da teater svizzer)

Television

Brooks, Tim and Marsh, Earle (1992). The Complete Directory to Prime Time Network and Cable TV Shows 1946–present (5th ed.). Ballantine.
Brown, Les (1992). Les Brown's Encyclopedia of Television (3rd ed.). Gale Research. 
Clements, Jonathan; Tamamuro, Motoko (2003). The Dorama Encyclopedia: A Guide to Japanese TV Drama Since 1953.

 

Langman, Larry; Molinari, Joseph A. (1990). The New Video Encyclopedia. New York: Garland. .
Maltin, Leonard (1969–2014). Leonard Maltin's TV Movies and Video Guide. New American Library.
 The first edition is freely available online.

Schemering, Christopher (1985). The Soap Opera Encyclopedia. Ballantine Books.
Slide, Anthony (1991). The Television Industry: A Historical Dictionary. Greenwood.
Stuckmann, Chris (2018). Anime Impact: The Movies and Shows that Changed the World of Japanese Animation. Mango Media. . 
Terrace, Vincent (1985–86). The Encyclopedia of Television: Series, Pilots, and Specials. Rev. ed., New York Zoetrope.

Waggett, Gerard J. (1997). The Soap Opera Encyclopedia. HarperPaperbacks.

Online TV databases 

 Anime News Network — Japanese animation
 Art of the Title — title sequences
 The Big Cartoon DataBase — animation
 Filmfront — Norwegian TV and film
 HanCinema — Korean TV and film
 IMDb
 Internet Movie Firearms Database — firearms in TV and film
 KinoPoisk — Russian TV and film
 Metacritic — aggregated reviews
 Moviemistakes.com — production mistakes
 PORT.hu — Central European TV and film
 Rotten Tomatoes — aggregated reviews
 Stopklatka.pl — Polish TV and film

Biography
Contemporary Theatre, Film & Television. Cengage Gale. 1984–. .
Morsberger, Robert Eustis, Stephen O. Lessek, and Randall Clark. 1984. American screenwriters. Gale Research. .

Actors

Film directors

IFILM (1984–). Film directors: A complete guide. Lone Eagle. .

See also 
 Bibliography of encyclopedias

References

Citations

Sources 
Guide to Reference.  American Library Association. Retrieved 5 December 2014. (subscription required).
Kister, Kenneth F. (1994). Kister's Best Encyclopedias (2nd ed.). Phoenix: Oryx. .

External links
The Howard Summers Website: National Filmographies

Film
Books about film
Bibliographies of film